The 1977 Colgate International of Australia, was a women's tennis tournament played on outdoor grass courts at White City Stadium in Sydney in Australia. The event was part of the AAA category of the 1978 Colgate Series. It was the second edition of the tournament and was held from 14 November through 20 November 1977. Eighth-seeded Evonne Goolagong Cawley, participating in her first tournament after a year absence due to the birth of her first child, won the singles title and earned $22,000 first-prize money and 160 ranking points.

Winners

Singles
 Evonne Goolagong Cawley defeated  Kerry Reid 6–1, 6–3
It was Goolagong Cawley's 1st title of the year and the 67th of her career.

Doubles
 Evonne Goolagong Cawley /  Betty Stöve vs.  Kerry Reid /  Greer Stevens divided

Prize money

Notes

References

External links
 International Tennis Federation (ITF) tournament details

Colgate International of Australia
Colgate International of Australia
Colgate International of Australia, 1977
Tennis tournaments in Australia
Colgate International of Australia